Ammayum Makalum is a 1980 Indian Malayalam film, directed by Stanley Jose. The film stars Jayabharathi, Jose, Ambika and Ravikumar in the lead roles. The film has musical score by Shyam.

Cast
 
Jayabharathi as Bharathi
Jose as Raju
Ambika as Radha
Ravikumar as Ravi
Seema as Ramani
Sukumari as Madhavi
Jagathy Sreekumar as Sankunni
Sreelatha Namboothiri as Kalyani 
Adoor Pankajam as Brahannala
Chandraji as Madhavi's father
K. P. Ummer as Kurup, Anandan (double role)
Lalu Alex as Vasu
Meena as Lakshmi
Adoor Bhasi as Gopalan

Soundtrack
The music was composed by Shyam and the lyrics were written by O. N. V. Kurup.

References

External links
 

1980 films
1980s Malayalam-language films